Veda BF is a 2018 Marathi-language drama film written and directed by Altaf Dadasaheb Shaikh. The film stars Nagesh Bhonsle, Vinit Bonde, and Altaf Raja. It was released on 19 January 2018. Altaf Raja made his comeback with this film.

Cast 
 Nagesh Bhonsle
 Vinit Bonde
 Altaf Raja (Special Appearance)
 Prajakta Deshpande
 Vishaka Ghuge
 Sagar Gore
 Jyotikumar Kosari
 Vijay Navale
 Shailesh Pitambare
 Vrundabal

Soundtrack 

Veda BF (Original Motion Picture Soundtrack)

Accolades

References

External links 
 

2018 films
2018 directorial debut films
2010s Marathi-language films